Prophyllocnistis epidrimys is a moth of the family Gracillariidae. It is known from Chile.

Adults are on wing in March in one generation.

The larvae feed on Drimys winteri, Drimys winteri andina and Drimys winteri chiliensis. They mine the leaves of their host plant. The mine has the form of an elongate, tortuous, upper surface, serpentine mine, with a dark brown median frass line. The larva webs together the terminal leaves of, thereby creating a nest inside of which it skeletonizes the foliage. Pupation occurs during late summer within a dark brown, loosely woven cocoon inside the leaf nest.

References

Phyllocnistinae
Endemic fauna of Chile